Ayakita Dam  is an arch dam located in Miyazaki Prefecture in Japan. The dam is used for flood control and power production. The catchment area of the dam is 149.3 km2. The dam impounds about 95  ha of land when full and can store 21300 thousand cubic meters of water. The construction of the dam was started on 1957 and completed in 1960.

See also
List of dams in Japan

References

Dams in Miyazaki Prefecture